Oleg Georgiyevich Lyubelskiy (born 12 June 1962 in Rubtsovsk; died 21 May 1994 in Omsk) was a Russian football player.

References

1962 births
People from Rubtsovsk
1994 deaths
Soviet footballers
FC Irtysh Omsk players
Russian footballers
FC Ural Yekaterinburg players
Russian Premier League players
FC Baltika Kaliningrad players
Association football goalkeepers
Sportspeople from Altai Krai